The Shiroro languages, also known as the Pongu languages, form a branch of the Kainji languages of Nigeria. They are spoken near Shiroro Lake.

Languages
There are four basic divisions within Shiroro:

Pongu (Rin) cluster, Gurmana
Baushi cluster, Fungwa (Ura)

Baushi is a language that constitutes half a dozen languages.

Footnotes

References
Roger Blench, The Shiroro languages

 
Kainji languages